The Roman Catholic Diocese of Sekondi–Takoradi is a diocese located in the city of Sekondi-Takoradi in the Ecclesiastical province of Cape Coast in Ghana.

History
 November 20, 1969: Established as Diocese of Sekondi–Takoradi from the Metropolitan Archdiocese of Cape Coast

Special churches
The Cathedral is  Our Lady Star of the Sea Cathedral in Takoradi.  The Pro-Cathedral is St. Paul’s Pro-Cathedral in Sekondi.

Bishops

Ordinaries
 Bishops of Sekondi–Takoradi (Latin Rite)
 Joseph Amihere Essuah (November 20, 1969 – October 7, 1980)
 Charles Kweku Sam (September 30, 1981 – January 13, 1998)
 John Martin Darko (June 27, 1998 – December 14, 2011)
 John Bonaventure Kwofie, C.S.Sp. S.S.L. (July 3, 2014 – January 2, 2019), appointed Archbishop of Accra
 John Baptiste Attakruk (June 24, 2021 – present)

Other priest of this diocese who became bishop
Joseph Francis Kweku Essien, appointed Bishop of Wiawso in 1999

See also
Catholicism in Ghana

Sources
 GCatholic.org
 Catholic Hierarchy

Roman Catholic dioceses in Ghana
Dioceses in Ghana
Christian organizations established in 1969
Roman Catholic dioceses and prelatures established in the 20th century
1969 establishments in Ghana
Roman Catholic Ecclesiastical Province of Cape Coast